Two submarines of the French Navy have borne the name Ondine:

 , an  launched in 1925 and sunk in 1928 on trials
 , an  launched in 1931 and scrapped in 1943

French Navy ship names